

Squad

Final Squad

Junior players with first team experience

Transfers

Out on loan

In

Out

Statistics

Top scorers

Overall

{|class="wikitable"
|-
|Games played || 72 (17 Campeonato Mineiro, 14 Copa Libertadores, 38 Campeonato Brasileiro, 3 Friendly match )
|-
|Games won || 42 (12 Campeonato Mineiro, 9 Copa Libertadores, 18 Campeonato Brasileiro, 3 Friendly match)
|-
|Games drawn || 16 (5 Campeonato Mineiro, 3 Copa Libertadores, 8 Campeonato Brasileiro, 0 Friendly match)
|-
|Games lost || 14 (0 Campeonato Mineiro, 2 Copa Libertadores, 12 Campeonato Brasileiro, 0 Friendly match)
|-
|Goals scored || 141
|-
|Goals conceded || 82
|-
|Goal difference || +59
|-
|Best result || 7-0 (H) v Democrata – Campeonato Mineiro – 2009.3.25 
|-
|Worst result || 0-4 (A) v Estudiantes – Copa Libertadores – 2009.4.8
|-
|Top scorer || Wellington Paulista (26 goals)
|-

Pre-season

Copa Bimbo

Bracket

Semi-final

Final

Juan Pablo Sorín farewell match

Campeonato Mineiro

League table

Matches

Bracket

Quarter-finals

Semi-finals

Finals

Copa Libertadores

Group stage

Knockout stage

Round of 16

Quarter-finals

Semi-finals

Finals

Campeonato Brasileiro

League table

Results summary

Pld = Matches played; W = Matches won; D = Matches drawn; L = Matches lost;

Results by round

Matches

See also
Cruzeiro Esporte Clube

References

External links
official website

Cruzeiro
Cruzeiro Esporte Clube seasons